There are 27 families of flowering plants whose earliest ancestors diverged from what became the two most prominent groups of flowering plants, the eudicots and monocots. They are quite diverse, and include woody and non-woody plants, evergreen and deciduous shrubs and trees, and plants that grow in soil, in water and on other plants.

Amborella may represent the earliest-diverging order of flowering plants. The parasitic genera Hydnora and Prosopanche are the only flowering plants with no evidence of leaves or scales. Myristica fragrans, the source of nutmeg, was important in the 17th-century spice trade.

The 27 families are generally placed in 9 orders. Canellales, Laurales, Magnoliales and Piperales are grouped together as the magnoliid orders, with Chloranthales as a sister group. Amborellales, Nymphaeales and Austrobaileyales are the basal angiosperms or the ANA grade. Ceratophyllales may have been the last of the nine orders to diverge, but some fossil evidence links it to the older order Chloranthales.

Glossary
From the glossary of botanical terms:
annual: a plant that completes its life cycle (i.e. germinates, reproduces, and dies) within a single year or growing season
deciduous: falling seasonally, as with bark, leaves, or petals
herbaceous: not woody; usually green and soft in texture
perennial: not an annual or biennial

Families

See also

Notes

Citations

References
 
 
   See http://creativecommons.org/licenses/by/4.0/ for license.
 
 
  
 
  See their terms-of-use license.
 
 
 
 

Systematic
Taxonomic lists (families)
Gardening lists
Lists of plants